Gnaruban Vinoth is a Sri Lankan international footballer who plays as a midfielder.

References

Sri Lankan footballers
Living people
Sri Lanka international footballers
Solid SC players
Association football midfielders
Year of birth missing (living people)
Sri Lanka Football Premier League players